Calvert City is a home rule-class city in Marshall County, Kentucky, United States. The population was 2,566 at the 2010 census.

History

Calvert City was named for Potilla Willis Calvert. He built his home, Oak Hill, in 1860 and around a decade later gave a portion of his land to a new railroad, specifying that a station be built near his home. That station served as the starting point of the town, which was incorporated on March 18, 1871. The railroad station and post office long favored the shorter Calvert, but the Board on Geographic Names reversed its earlier decision in 1957 and switched to the longer form.

By 1896, Calvert City was known as a sundown town, where African Americans were not allowed to reside. By 1908, the rest of Marshall County had also expelled its African American residents.

During the Ohio River flood of 1937, Calvert City's business district and much of the residential area was severely damaged by floodwaters.

In the 1940s, the construction of nearby Kentucky Dam by the Tennessee Valley Authority brought plentiful electric power that led to many industrial plants, mostly chemical manufacturers, to locate between the city and the Tennessee River. Merchant Luther Draffen was instrumental in attracting the dam and industrial plants.

Geography
According to the United States Census Bureau, the city has a total area of 13.9 square miles (36.1 km), of which 13.9 square miles (35.9 km) is land and 0.1 square mile (0.1 km) (0.36%) is water.

Demographics

As of the census of 2000, there were 2,701 people, 1,141 households, and 787 families residing in the city. The racial makeup of the city was 99.00% White, 0.26% Native American, 0.07% Asian, 0.04% from other races, and 0.63% from two or more races. Hispanic or Latino of any race were 0.37% of the population.

There were 1,141 households, out of which 28.4% had children under the age of 18 living with them, 55.9% were married couples living together, 9.7% had a female householder with no husband present, and 31.0% were non-families. 28.7% of all households were made up of individuals, and 12.3% had someone living alone who was 65 years of age or older. The average household size was 2.27 and the average family size was 2.76.

The age distribution was 21.0% under the age of 18, 7.0% from 18 to 24, 25.4% from 25 to 44, 26.3% from 45 to 64, and 20.2% who were 65 years of age or older. The median age was 43 years. For every 100 females, there were 88.7 males. For every 100 females age 18 and over, there were 82.3 males.

The median income for a household in the city was $41,107, and the median income for a family was $48,098. Males had a median income of $43,464 versus $23,403 for females. The per capita income for the city was $22,473. About 4.5% of families and 6.9% of the population were below the poverty line, including 7.1% of those under age 18 and 10.3% of those age 65 or over.

Economy
Calvert City has 16 industrial plants that are a key source of employment for Western Kentucky. The majority are chemical manufacturers with some steel and metallurgical plants and industrial services firms.

Arts and culture
 Kentucky Dam Village State Resort Park 
 Calvert Drive-In Theater  Apple Valley Hillbilly Gardens And Toy Museum

Government
Calvert City has a mayor-council form of government, as allowed by its standing as a home rule-class city under Kentucky's system of local government classification.

While Marshall county had been dry since 1938, on July 28, 2015 the county voted by a margin of 6431 to 6229 to permit the sale of both packaged liquor and drink sales. Currently, Calvert City is the only city in the county that also permits the sale of alcohol on Sunday.

Media

Newspaper
 The Lake News, a weekly newspaper is owned and operated by Loyd W. Ford. It was founded in 1984 and is the newspaper of record for the City of Calvert. The Lake News has a circulation of 2800 and is distributed in Marshall and Livingston Counties in Kentucky.

Radio
 WCCK-FM — 95.7

Education
Calvert City has a lending library, a branch of the Marshall County Public Library.

Infrastructure

Transportation
Calvert City is a hub for surface transportation. The city is the northern terminus of the Julian M. Carroll Purchase Parkway, providing a link to Memphis, Tennessee. The city is skirted on the south by Interstate 24, linking Calvert City to Nashville and St. Louis, and, via I-69, and via the Western Kentucky Parkway as well, Louisville and Lexington. The city has rail access through the Paducah and Louisville Railway main line and is a commercial port on the Tennessee River. There is no bus service or other mass transit.

References
 Historical marker, 26 Aspen St., Calvert City, Ky. Kentucky Historical Marker Database

External links

Cities in Kentucky
Cities in Marshall County, Kentucky
Kentucky populated places on the Tennessee River
Sundown towns in Kentucky